Sillery is a commune in the north-eastern French department of Marne.

Champagne

The village's vineyards are located in the Montagne de Reims subregion of Champagne, and are classified as Grand Cru (100%) in the Champagne vineyard classification. The vineyards produce mostly Chardonnay grapes; the grapes are used to produce both Champagne and still Coteaux Champenois wine.

See also
Communes of the Marne department
Classification of Champagne vineyards
Fort de la Pompelle, a nearby World War I fortification

References

Communes of Marne (department)
Grand Cru Champagne villages